Josep Señé Escudero (born 10 December 1991) is a Spanish professional footballer who plays as a right winger for CD Lugo.

Club career
Born in Sant Cugat del Vallès, Barcelona, Catalonia, Señé finished his development with Terrassa FC after starting out at Sant Cugat Esport i Junior, and made his senior debut with the former club in 2010, in the Segunda División B. In July of that year he joined Real Madrid, being assigned to the C team in the Tercera División.

On 30 July 2012, Señé was loaned to Real Oviedo of the third division for one year. On 5 July of the following year, he signed a permanent one-year deal after his contract with Real Madrid expired.

Señé cut ties with the Asturian side on 24 January 2015. The following day, he joined RC Celta de Vigo on a one-year contract, being assigned to the reserves also in the third tier.

On 29 July 2015, Señé was promoted to Celta's main squad in La Liga. He made his professional debut on 28 November, coming on as a late substitute for Fabián Orellana in a 2–1 home win against Sporting de Gijón.

On 20 July 2017, Señé was transferred to Cultural y Deportiva Leonesa of Segunda División. On 10 July 2019, he agreed to a three-year contract with RCD Mallorca, recently returned to the top flight. He appeared in only eight competitives matches during the season, in an eventual relegation.
 
Señé was loaned to division two club CD Castellón on 14 August 2020, for one year. He was first-choice during the campaign and scored two goals, being relegated.

On 3 August 2021, Señé signed a two-year deal with fellow second-tier CD Lugo.

Career statistics

Club

References

External links

1991 births
Living people
People from Sant Cugat del Vallès
Sportspeople from the Province of Barcelona
Spanish footballers
Footballers from Catalonia
Association football wingers
La Liga players
Segunda División players
Segunda División B players
Tercera División players
Terrassa FC footballers
Real Madrid C footballers
Real Oviedo players
Celta de Vigo B players
RC Celta de Vigo players
Cultural Leonesa footballers
RCD Mallorca players
CD Castellón footballers
CD Lugo players